Kaj-Erik Eriksen (born 15 February 1979) is a Canadian actor. He is known for his roles as David Scali in The Commish, Danny Farrell in the television series The 4400, and Jeremy Peters in the television series Boston Public.

Personal life 
Eriksen enjoys music, and is a fan of the Dave Matthews Band.

Eriksen's father is Danish and his mother is Swedish.

Filmography

Film

Television

References

External links 

Kaj-Erik Eriksen on Facebook

1979 births
Male actors from Vancouver
Canadian male child actors
Canadian male film actors
Canadian people of Danish descent
Canadian male television actors
Canadian emigrants to the United States
American people of Danish descent
American male child actors
American male film actors
American male television actors
Living people
Canadian people of Swedish descent
American people of Swedish descent